San Fernando is a municipality and city located in the Mexican state of Tamaulipas. The municipality has a population of 57,220, while the city itself has a population of 29,665.

Massacres
San Fernando, Tamaulipas is notorious for experiencing two of the largest recorded massacres of the Mexican drug war. The first massacre, known as the 2010 San Fernando massacre, occurred following a gunfight in Tamaulipas between drug cartel gunmen and Mexican authorities, in which three gunmen and a marine were killed. After the authorities patrolled the nearby area, they found a horrifying surprise—72 bodies were found in a remote ranch in Tamaulipas. It was "the biggest single discovery of its kind" in the ongoing drug war. The 58 men and 14 women were believed to be undocumented migrants from South and Central America trying to cross the border to the United States. A surviving migrant claims that the migrants were kidnapped by the Los Zetas cartel and killed for refusing to do work for them. Twenty one rifles, 101 ammunition clips, four bullet-proof vests, camouflage uniforms and four vehicles were seized by officials. The bodies were found in a room, some of which were piled up on top of each other.

The second massacre, the 2011 San Fernando massacre, was after Mexican authorities exhumed more than 40 mass graves, leaving the final body count to 193 corpses.

External links

Gobierno Municipal de San Fernando Official website

References

Municipalities of Tamaulipas